Dushantha Lakshman Rodrigo (born 5 October 1968) is the 16th and current Anglican Bishop of Colombo.

Early life 
Dushantha Lakshman Rodrigo was born in Trincomalee on 5 October 1968, the son of Arthur William Rodrigo and Ruth Adlene De Alwis, his parents married at the Jaffna Methodist Church in 1960. His father, Arthur, served in the Sri Lankan Navy.

Education 
Rodrigo received his primary and secondary education at S. Thomas' College, Mount Lavinia. He later joined the Theological College of Lanka. He holds a PgD in Counselling and Psychosocial Support from the University of Colombo, and an MA in Development Studies from the Open University of Sri Lanka.

Ministry 
Rodrigo also served as a chaplain at several schools, such as; S. Thomas' College, Gurutalawa 1995 -  1999, Bishop's College, Colombo 2008 - 2011,  S. Thomas' College, Mount Lavinia (He also served as the acting warden) 2011.

He was later appointed the Headmaster of S. Thomas' Preparatory School, from 2015-2020.

Rodrigo was initially an assistant curate at Holy Trinity Church, Nuwara Eliya, and Christ Church Ragala from 1995 - 1996. He was also the vicar at several churches; Church of the Ascension Matara 2000 - 2003, Christ Church Mutwal from 2003 - 2006, St Michael and All Angels Church, Polwatte 2006 - 2011, St Mary & St John Church, Nugegoda from 2012 - 2017, and St. Paul's Church Colombo 2017-2020.
In 2020, Rodrigo became the 16th Bishop of Colombo.

References

Living people
Alumni of S. Thomas' College, Mount Lavinia
Sri Lankan Christian clergy
1968 births
Anglican bishops of Colombo